Millieme is a French word meaning one thousandth of something.  In English it may refer to:  
 Millieme (angle), a French unit of plane angle similar to a milliradian.
 One thousandth of an Egyptian pound, Tunisian dinar, or Libyan pound.

Numbers